The Canadian Province of New Brunswick has eight municipalities that hold city status. These eight cities had a cumulative population of 272,174 and an average population of 34,022 in the 2016 Census. New Brunswick's largest and smallest cities are Moncton and Campbellton, with populations of 71,889 and 6,883, respectively.

List

See also 
List of communities in New Brunswick
List of counties of New Brunswick
List of local service districts in New Brunswick
List of municipalities in New Brunswick
List of parishes in New Brunswick
List of municipal amalgamations in New Brunswick
List of towns in New Brunswick
List of villages in New Brunswick
List of neighbourhoods in New Brunswick
Rural community

Notes

References 

Cities